Corçà is a village and municipality in the province of Girona and autonomous community of Catalonia, Spain.

Besides the village of Corçà, the municipality includes the following populated places:

References

External links
 Government data pages 

Municipalities in Baix Empordà
Populated places in Baix Empordà